Fuentes de Corbeiro (or Fuentes de Corbero) is one of 54 parishes in Cangas del Narcea, a municipality within the province and autonomous community of Asturias, in northern Spain.

Villages
 Fontes de Curveiru
 Valmayor

References

Parishes in Cangas del Narcea